The Khorbusuonka is a river in Yakutia (Sakha Republic), Russia.

The river flows north of the Arctic Circle across a lonely, desolate area of Bulunsky District devoid of settlements.

Course  
The Khorbusuonka is a right tributary of the Olenyok. Its sources are in the southern part of the Kystyk Plateau, located southwest of the Chekanovsky Ridge. It flows first in an ESE direction, then it bends and flows roughly northwards, still within the plateau. Its channel is winding within a wide valley in the Kystyk Plateau area. In its very last stretch the river descends to the Olenyok floodplain, where there are a few lakes right by the great river to the south of the Kelimyar.

Owing to the harshness of the climate the river is frozen most of the year. It stays under ice between early October and early June.

Flora and fauna  
The river basin is dominated by tundra with sparse larch forest and some willow thickets by the riverside in wide valleys.
Since the area is uninhabited, deer are numerous and fearless. The main fish species in the waters is lenok.

See also
List of rivers of Russia

References

External links 
Р. Хорбусуонка, приток р. Оленек. 06.07.2006 - Picture of the river
Fishing & Tourism in Yakutia
Хорбусуонка Река (галерея статьи) - Вода России

Rivers of the Sakha Republic
North Siberian Lowland
Tributaries of the Olenyok